Elisabeth Lund Engebretsen (born 23 September 1973) is a Norwegian anthropologist and gender studies scholar. She is a full professor of gender studies at the University of Stavanger and a Visiting Senior Fellow at the London School of Economics.

Career

Engebretsen earned a cand.mag. in Chinese and anthropology at the University of Oslo in 1997, a master's degree in gender studies at the London School of Economics (LSE) in 2000, a master's degree in anthropology at LSE in 2003 and a PhD in anthropology at LSE in 2008. She has also studied Chinese at universities in China, where she has lived for extended periods. Her dissertation advisers were Henrietta Moore and Charles Stafford. She was a senior lecturer in gender studies at the University of Oslo until she became an associate professor of gender studies at the University of Stavanger in 2018. She was promoted to full professor in 2022. She is a Visiting Senior Fellow at LSE.

Her research areas include gender and diversity, feminist and queer theory, social anthropology and ethnography, social movements and activism, and she has a particular focus on China and the Nordic countries.

Engebretsen was a member of the executive board of the Norwegian Organisation for Sexual and Gender Diversity from 2018 to 2020, and is active in the Green Party.

References

Living people
1973 births
Gender studies academics
Academic staff of the University of Stavanger
Norwegian women anthropologists
University of Oslo alumni